Giant African land snail is the common name of several species within the family Achatinidae, a family of unusually large African terrestrial snails:

 Achatina achatina, also known as the agate snail or Ghana tiger snail
 Lissachatina fulica, a serious agricultural pest in some countries
 Archachatina marginata, (Archachatina marginata)